The Embassy of Peru in Sweden is the diplomatic mission of Peru in Sweden.

The current Peruvian ambassador to Sweden is Cristina María del Rosario Ronquillo de Blödorn.

History
Diplomatic relations between Peru and Sweden were established in the 1930s. The embassy was closed in 2010 but reopened in 2012. The ambassador in Stockholm is also accredited to neighbouring Denmark and has also been accredited to Iceland and Norway, as well as Finland.

See also
Embassy of Sweden, Lima

Notes

References

Peru
Sweden
Peru–Sweden relations